Mengzi is a city in the southeast of Yunnan Province, China. Mengzi was formerly Mengzi County until October 2010, when it was upgraded to a county-level city. Mengzi is the core region of the central city agglomeration of Southern Yunnan, which is officially regarded as the political, economic, cultural, and military centre of Southern Yunnan.

Name

The origin of the name 
A widely accepted statement is that the name "Mengzi" (蒙自) was originated from Muze Mountain (now named as Lianhua Mountain) located in the west of Mengzi and now belongs to Gejiu. In Yi language, Muze Mountain means a towering mountain.

The romanized spelling 
As with many other places in China, a variety of Romanized spellings were used for the name of Mengzi city in the past. The traditional French spelling was Mongtseu; the postal, Mengtsz, Mengtzu or Mongtze. Some works in English used the spelling Mêng-tse or Mengtsze.

Government
The municipal seat is in Guanlan Subdistrict.

Administrative divisions
In the present, Mengzi City has 5 subdistricts, 6 towns and 2 ethnic townships. 
5 subdistricts

 Wenlan
 Yuguopu
 Guanlan (观澜街道）
 Wencui (文萃街道)
 Xin'ansuo (新安所街道)

6 towns (including townships)

2 ethnic townships
 Qilubai (Miao)
 Laozhai (Miao)

Geography and climate

Located within 30 arc minutes south of the Tropic of Cancer, Mengzi, as with much of southern Yunnan, has a warm humid subtropical climate (Köppen Cwa), with muddled distinction between the seasons and daytime temperatures remaining warm year-round. With monthly percent possible sunshine ranging from 34% in June and July to 64% in February, the city receives 2,161 hours of bright sunshine annually.

Food
The Mengzi region is well known for a dish called guoqiao mixian ("Over the Bridge Rice Noodle"), made with long rice-flour noodles.

History
The history of Mengzi can be traced back to Western Han dynasty when Bengu County (贲古县) was founded (109 B.C.), which was currently the area of Xin'ansuo, Mengzi.

Not until in 1276 (Yuan dynasty), Mengzi county was formerly founded, which can be regarded as the prototype of the modern Mengzi City.

In the 19th century, Mengzi was a  major trading center for commerce between the interior of Yunnan and the Northern area of Vietnam.

In 1886, a French convention chose Mengzi to be the center of trade in Yunnan province for importing and exporting goods via Tongking in Vietnam.  Facilities for this opened two years later.

Communications were inconvenient: goods from Hanoi or Haiphong were shipped to Hekou on the Vietnamese border by junk, transferred by small craft to Manhao, and then taken  by pack animal to Mengzi. Despite these difficulties, Mengzi was an important port of entry into both Yunnan and western Guizhou provinces, and in 1889 it was opened to foreign trade as a treaty port. Most of this foreign trade was in tin and opium. Its main exports were tin and opium, and the main imports were mostly textiles (primarily cotton) and tobacco.

As a trading center, the city gradually began to lose its importance beginning from the early 20th century. The importance of Mengzi was ended by the construction of the French railway from Haiphong to Kunming (the Yunnan provincial capital) in 1906–10. This railway bypassed Mengzi, but in 1915 a branch line was built via the town to the Gejiu tin mines. Apart from a brief respite during the early days of World War II, the town of Mengzi has, nevertheless, steadily declined in importance ever since.

Gejiu became a county in 1913, and a city in 1951. With the improvement of communications and transportation between cities of Gejiu and Kaiyuan and the other counties nearby, plus the development of trade between southwestern China and the countries of Southeast Asia, Mengzi's ties have increasingly strengthened with Gejiu and Kaiyuan. The whole area has become a border economic centre. In addition to tin, the county's natural resources include coal, manganese, lead, zinc, and antimony.

When Japanese troops drove Beijing and Tianjin university professors, students, and administrators out of those cities, and then later out of Changsha as well, the academics made their own long march to Yunnan Province.  They first established themselves in Mengzi, but after a year or so moved on to the provincial capital, Kunming.  This was Lianda, or the Southwest Associated Universities.

Recently, the prefectural government has moved from nearby Gejiu to Mengzi.  New wealthy suburbs and large government offices have sprung up as a result, but much of the poverty remains, creating a large wealth gap within the city.

In 2012, 11-14 thousand year old early human bones from Maludong near Mengzi City (some of them already in museum collections) were reported. These are provisionally known as the Red Deer Cave people.

Twin towns — Sister cities
Mengzi is twinned with:

  Modesto, California, United States
  Lao Cai, Lào Cai, Vietnam

Economy 
Mengzi used to be an agricultural undeveleped county before it rebecame the prefectural capital city in 2003 and being upgraded to a city administratively in 2010. 

Real estate industry is the backbone of city's industry. The local government has also been developing policies to promote the transformation of the city's industries in recent years and has achieved some success.

Transport

Railway
 The narrow-gauge Kunming–Hai Phong railway, in the mountains east of the city (passenger service discontinued), and its branches
 Yuxi–Mengzi railway (opened in 2013)
 Mengzi–Hekou railway (opened in December 2014);  regular passenger service between Kunming and Hekou
 Mile–Mengzi high-speed railway (Honghe railway station)

Tram
Honghe tram runs from Mengzi North railway station to the city center.

Airport
Honghe Mengzi Airport in Mengzi is under construction.

References 

 BBC report on Mengzi

External links

 Mengzi City official website

County-level divisions of Honghe Prefecture
Cities in Yunnan